"Get Lifted" is the second single released from Keith Murray's debut album, The Most Beautifullest Thing in This World. Like Murray's previous single, "Get Lifted" was produced and featuring backing vocals from Erick Sermon. It peaked at 71 on the Billboard 200 and 7 on the Hot Rap Singles. The song samples "I Get Lifted" by George McCrae which was used.

Single track listing
"Get Lifted" (Radio Version)- 3:59  
"Get Lifted" (Erick Sermon's Remix)- 4:18  
"Get Lifted" (LP Instrumental)- 4:03  
"Get Lifted" (LP Version)- 4:03  
"Get Lifted" (Remix Instrumental)- 4:18  
"Pay Per View"- 3:00

Charts

1995 singles
Songs about cannabis
Keith Murray (rapper) songs
Song recordings produced by Erick Sermon
1994 songs